Cinéma du Réel (Cinema of the Real) is an international documentary film festival organized by the BPI-Bibliothèque publique d'information (Public Information Library) in Paris and was founded in 1978. The festival presents about 200 films per year in several sections by experienced documentary directors as well as first timers. The screenings take place at the Pompidou Centre in Paris, and in several movie theaters partners of the festival.

The 37th edition of Cinéma du réel took place from in March 2015.

Foundation
The founders of the festival were Jean-Michel Arnold and Jean Rouch and the first festival was held in 1978.

Purpose
The Cinéma du Réel has developed into one of the major documentary film festivals where a public of 170,000 view hundreds of documentaries by established professionals and newcomers. It also includes workshops seminars and a retrospective program highlighting the best of documentary cinema history.

Prizes
 Grand Prize of the Cinéma du Réel, €8000.
 The Library Award (Prix des Bibliothèques),  €6000.
 Scam International Prize, €4600.
 Louis Marcorelles Award (given by the French Ministry of Foreign Affairs for English and Spanish subtitling, DVD publishing and financing a foreign mission)
 Short Film Prize, €2500.
 The Young Jury Award, €2500.
 Joris Ivens Award for a first film, €2500.
 Heritage Award, for a film whose subject matter involves France, €2500.
 Pierre and Yolande Perrault Grant awarded to a young filmmaker, €2500

References

External links
 Cinéma du Réel  Official Site

Documentary film festivals in France